Lure of the Islands is a 1942 American adventure film directed by Jean Yarbrough and written by Edmond Kelso, George Bricker and Scott Littleton. The film stars Margie Hart, Robert Lowery, Guinn "Big Boy" Williams, Gale Storm, Ivan Lebedeff and Warren Hymer. The film was released on July 3, 1942, by Monogram Pictures.

Plot

In the South Pacific, undercover agents Wally and Jinx look for their local contact who was shot by the commandant, a Nazi, before he could pass details of a secret German/Japanese radio.

Island girls under taboo, Tana and Maui, agree to help, but for a price – they want to get married!
 
The Nazis kidnap the chief to force the natives to cut down trees to build an air field, but cutting the trees is forbidden. Wally and Jinx rescue the chief and a Japanese plane crashes in the trees that were never cut.

The islanders are free from occupation, and the two couples leave with the help of a destroyer.

Cast          
Margie Hart as Tana O'Shaughnessy
Robert Lowery as Wally
Guinn "Big Boy" Williams as Jinx
Gale Storm as Maui
Ivan Lebedeff as Commandant
Warren Hymer as Albert
Tris Coffin as Skipper
John Bleifer as Lt. Lavar
Satini Pualoa as Matu
Namure Nordman as Native Girl
Kam Tong as Lt. Kono
Angelo Cruz as Japanese Pilot
Kahala Bray as Dancer 
Odetta Bray as Dancer

References

External links
 

1942 films
1940s English-language films
American adventure films
1942 adventure films
Monogram Pictures films
Films directed by Jean Yarbrough
American black-and-white films
World War II films made in wartime
American war drama films